John H. Havron (December 23, 1843 – October 28, 1910) was an American soldier who fought in the American Civil War. Havron received his country's highest award for bravery during combat, the Medal of Honor. Havron's medal was won for his extraordinary heroism during the Third Battle of Petersburg, in Virginia on April 2, 1865. He was honored with the award on May 12, 1865.

Havron was born in Ireland, and entered service in Providence, Rhode Island. He died in 1910 in New Orleans, Louisiana.

Medal of Honor citation

See also

List of American Civil War Medal of Honor recipients: G–L
Third Battle of Petersburg
Battery G, 1st Rhode Island Light Artillery

Notes

References

External links

1843 births
1910 deaths
American Civil War recipients of the Medal of Honor
Irish-born Medal of Honor recipients
Irish emigrants to the United States (before 1923)
Irish soldiers in the United States Army
People from Providence, Rhode Island
People of Rhode Island in the American Civil War
Union Army officers
United States Army Medal of Honor recipients